Bald! is a "fly-on-the-wall" documentary about baldness, broadcast on Channel 4 in the United Kingdom in April 2003. The show followed a number of men as they tried to hold back the advancement of hair loss, and the methods that they tried to cope with the problem.

Methods shown in the show

Spray-on hair

The first method shown in the programme was 'Spray-on Hair' which was used by a 28-year-old man called Russell.  The product is a coloured hair spray which is applied to existing hair follicles making them appear thicker, covering up thinning and bald patches. Effectively giving the impression of a full head of hair, it was not shown to work successfully on the programme.  By the end Russell confirms he has now accepted his hair loss and gives advice and support to other men suffering from it.

Lotions and laser treatment
The subsequent method featured was laser treatment, with a man named Ian who was having a year's course. Ian was also shown in the programme using a number of hair-restoring lotions such as minoxidil (commonly known by the name Regaine).

Hair graft
Next, a man named Lee was shown undergoing his second round of surgery, in which follicles from the back of his head were excised, and then grafted to the bald patch on top.

Hair replacement
The fourth segment of the programme showed a top hairdresser called James, who has a number of hair strands embedded into a small piece of skin-like material, that was integrated over his bald patch and in between his own hairs.

External links
Bald! at Channel4.com

Channel 4 original programming
British television documentaries
2003 television specials
Documentary films about human hair